James Head (born February 9, 1984) is an American mixed martial artist who  competed in the Welterweight division of the Ultimate Fighting Championship.

Mixed martial arts
James started training at Lovato's in 2008 and quickly earned a purple belt in Brazilian jiu-jitsu after winning the silver medal at the 2010 World Championships as a blue belt. Before James arrived at Lovato's, he had over six years of boxing experience, and was the Southwest Regional Amateur Champion in Texas. He has since been incorporating Lovato's Mixed Martial Arts program into his arsenal and currently holds an 8-2 pro record and a 5-0 amateur record as a MMA fighter. James has been studying the art of Muay Thai and is showing his techniques to the Lovato's Team, demonstrating how to throw a proper punch, kick, elbow and knee.

Early career
In August 2009 he suffered his first loss to Jesse Forbes resulting in a 5–1 record. He then bounced back with a TKO win over Bill Albrecht.

His biggest win to date came over UFC veteran Gerald Harris at the Tulsa Hard Rock Cafe. He won the fight via unanimous decision.

Ultimate Fighting Championship
With his win over Harris, Head earned a shot in the UFC and made his debut against undefeated Nick Ring at UFC 131.  He lost the fight via submission in the third round.

Head was expected to face Mark Scanlon on November 5, 2011 at UFC 138.  However, Scanlon was pulled from the bout and replaced by promotional newcomer John Maguire  Then, on September 28, Head himself pulled out of the fight due to an undisclosed injury and was replaced by Justin Edwards.

Head made his welterweight debut against Papy Abedi at UFC on Fuel TV: Gustafsson vs. Silva. He won the fight at 4:33 in the first round via rear naked choke.

Head was expected to face Claude Patrick on July 21, 2012 at UFC 149.  However, Patrick was forced out of the bout with an injury and replaced by Brian Ebersole. Head won via split decision (29-28, 28–29, 29-28).

Head faced Mike Pyle on December 15, 2012 at The Ultimate Fighter: Team Carwin vs. Team Nelson Finale. He lost via TKO in the first round.

Head was scheduled to fight Nick Catone on April 27, 2013 at UFC 159. During official weigh-ins, Head registered 170.25 pounds while Catone failed to make weight, coming in at 173 pounds. Catone was allowed two hours to attempt to shed weight before a second weigh-in opportunity was offered him. He did not re-weigh. Catone was subsequently fined 20% of his purse, and the bout was scheduled to proceed as a catchweight match. The day of the show, it was announced that Catone had been hospitalized for "severe dehydration", and the fight was officially pulled from the card.

Head was expected to face Bobby Voelker on August 28, 2013 at UFC Fight Night 27.  However, on July 11, it was announced that Voelker had been tabbed as a replacement for Siyar Bahadurzada and would face Robbie Lawler on July 27, 2013 at UFC on Fox 8.  Head instead faced Jason High at UFC Fight Night 27. He lost the bout via first round guillotine choke submission. After the loss Head was subsequently released from the UFC.

Mixed martial arts record 

|-
|Loss
|align=center| 9–4
|Jason High
|Submission (guillotine choke)
|UFC Fight Night: Condit vs. Kampmann 2
|
|align=center| 1
|align=center| 1:41
|Indianapolis, Indiana, United States
|
|-
|Loss
|align=center| 9–3
|Mike Pyle
|TKO (knee and punches)
|The Ultimate Fighter 16 Finale
|
|align=center| 1
|align=center| 1:55
|Las Vegas, Nevada, United States
|
|-
|Win
|align=center| 9–2
|Brian Ebersole
|Decision (split)
|UFC 149
|
|align=center| 3
|align=center| 5:00
|Calgary, Alberta, Canada
|
|-
|Win
|align=center| 8–2
|Papy Abedi
|Submission (rear-naked choke)
|UFC on Fuel TV: Gustafsson vs. Silva
|
|align=center| 1
|align=center| 4:33
|Stockholm, Sweden
|
|-
|Loss
|align=center| 7–2
|Nick Ring
|Submission (rear-naked choke)
|UFC 131
|
|align=center| 3
|align=center| 3:33
|Vancouver, British Columbia, Canada
|
|-
|Win
|align=center| 7–1
|Gerald Harris
|Decision (unanimous)
|Xtreme Fight Night: Harris vs. Head
|
|align=center| 3
|align=center| 5:00
|Tulsa, Oklahoma, United States
| 
|-
|Win
|align=center| 6–1
|Bill Albrecht
|TKO (punches)
|Bricktown Brawl 5
|
|align=center| 1
|align=center| 1:46
|Oklahoma City, Oklahoma, United States
| 
|-
|Loss
|align=center| 5–1
|Jesse Forbes
|Decision (unanimous)
|PB MMA : Live Saturday Night 
|
|align=center| 3
|align=center| 5:00
|Springdale, Arkansas, United States
|
|-
|Win
|align=center| 5–0
|Chris Henning
|TKO (punches)
|TAP Entertainment: Ultimate Fight Night 3 	
|
|align=center| 1
|align=center| 2:20
|Muskogee, Oklahoma, United States
| 
|-
|Win
|align=center| 4–0
|Lee McKibbin
|Submission (triangle choke)
|CW 9: Max Extreme Fighting 
|
|align=center| 2
|align=center| N/A
|Belfast, Northern Ireland
|
|-
|Win
|align=center| 3–0
|Eric Bradley
|TKO (punches)
|Masters of the Cage 16 
|
|align=center| 2
|align=center| 1:47
|Oklahoma City, Oklahoma, United States
| 
|-
|Win
|align=center| 2–0
|Ruben Escamilla
|Submission
|Masters of the Cage 14 
|
|align=center| 1
|align=center| 2:12
|Oklahoma City, Oklahoma, United States
| 
|-
|Win
|align=center| 1–0
|Chance Fine
|TKO (punches)
|Masters of the Cage 7 
|
|align=center| 1
|align=center| 1:02
|Oklahoma City, Oklahoma, United States
|

References

External links
Official UFC Profile
Pro Fight Record

1984 births
Living people
American male mixed martial artists
Mixed martial artists from Illinois
Middleweight mixed martial artists
Mixed martial artists utilizing boxing
Mixed martial artists utilizing Muay Thai
Mixed martial artists utilizing Brazilian jiu-jitsu
People from Highland, Illinois
Sportspeople from Oklahoma City
Mixed martial artists from Oklahoma
Ultimate Fighting Championship male fighters
American male boxers
American Muay Thai practitioners
American practitioners of Brazilian jiu-jitsu